Dixit may refer to:

 Ipse dixit, a Latin phrase used to identify and describe a sort of arbitrary dogmatic statement
 Dixit (card game)
 Dixit Dominus, or Psalm 110, from the Book of Psalms
 Dixit Dominus (Handel), a 1707 setting of that psalm by George Frideric Handel
 Dixit–Stiglitz model, model of monopolistic competition
 Dikshit or Dixit, a Hindu Brahmin family name